Frederick Fitton (12 January 1905 – 6 January 1965) was an English professional association footballer who played as a centre forward for a number of teams in the Football League.

In 1946 he went to Deventer to coach Go Ahead.

References

1905 births
1970 deaths
Footballers from Bury, Greater Manchester
English footballers
Association football forwards
Burnley F.C. players
Oldham Athletic A.F.C. players
Southend United F.C. players
Accrington Stanley F.C. (1891) players
Rochdale A.F.C. players
Nelson F.C. players
English Football League players
English expatriate football managers
Expatriate football managers in the Netherlands
Go Ahead Eagles managers